The Midwestern Higher Education Compact (MHEC) is a regional interstate compact devoted to advancing cooperation and resource sharing in higher education. The member states of the Compact are Illinois, Indiana, Iowa, Kansas, Minnesota, Michigan, Missouri, Nebraska, North Dakota, Ohio, South Dakota, and Wisconsin.

The Compact is one of four regional compacts in the United States dedicated to advancing higher education.

MHEC is headquartered in Minneapolis, Minnesota.

Mission 

The compact seeks to achieve its mission in higher education through initiatives in cost savings, student access, and policy research. In these three areas, MHEC attempts to reduce administrative costs, encourage student access, facilitate public policy analysis and information analysis, increase regional academic cooperation, promote educational programs, and encourage innovation in the field of higher education.

Organization 
The MHEC Executive Committee is the MHEC's governing body.  Each of the member states appoint five commissioners to the executive committee. These commissioners consist of the governor or the governor's designee, a member of each chamber of the state legislature, and two at-large members, one of whom must come from post-secondary education. 

MHEC is funded through appropriations from each of its member states and through foundation grants.  It is designated as a 501(c)(3) non-profit organization. MHEC's initiatives save colleges, universities, and students millions of dollars annually. Research and convenings generate ideas and policy that improve the quality, accessibility, and affordability of postsecondary education and has over 100 employees in 12 Member states.

See also
National Student Exchange
New England Board of Higher Education
Southern Regional Education Board
Western Interstate Commission for Higher Education

Notes

External links 
 Midwestern Higher Education Compact

United States interstate compacts
1991 establishments in Minnesota